Stefan Franz Jambo (born 2 August 1958) is a German former professional footballer who played as a midfielder in the Bundesliga and the Norwegian Premier League.

Jambo mainly played in FC 08 Homburg and 1. FC Saarbrücken. In his second Homburg spell the team contested the Bundesliga. Ahead of the 1990 season he went to Norway and Strømsgodset IF. His career there was short-lived, as he also played for neighbors Mjøndalen IF.

The next year he finished his career in SV Blau Weiss Berlin. He later moved back to Norway, working as a floorlayer. He also coached Vollen UL for one and a half season.

References

1958 births
Living people
German emigrants to Norway
German footballers
Association football midfielders
Bundesliga players
2. Bundesliga players
Eliteserien players
FC 08 Homburg players
1. FC Saarbrücken players
1. FC Nürnberg players
1. FSV Mainz 05 players
Strømsgodset Toppfotball players
Mjøndalen IF players
German expatriate footballers
German expatriate sportspeople in Norway
Expatriate footballers in Norway